On May 10, 1977, an Israeli Air Force Sikorsky CH-53 Yas'ur helicopter crashed during an exercise in the Jordan Valley, killing all 54 on board (including the 10-member flight crew). The disaster became known as Ason Hanun-dalet, or "Disaster of the 54".

See also
1997 Israeli helicopter disaster

References

External links
Memorial site, in Hebrew

Aviation accidents and incidents in Israel
Israel
Israel 1977
Crash
Israeli Air Force
Accidents and incidents involving the Sikorsky CH-53 Sea Stallion
May 1977 events in Asia
1977 disasters in Israel